Siobhan Austen Mother of Grace Austen is an Australian economist and was a Professor of Economics and discipline lead of Economics at Curtin University until December 2020.

Academic career 
Austen obtained her Ph.D. in 2001 at the University of Melbourne. Her thesis, on the topic of the cultural aspects of labor markets, and was later published as a book by Edward Elgar Publishing. She has published more than 100 scholarly works.

In 1990 Austen was appointed at Curtin University, where she was promoted Professor in 2016. She has led projects awarded by the Australian Research Council as well as by the National Council of Vocational and Education Research. She has also received project-based funding from the Australian Housing and Urban Research Institute and AusAID.

Her research focuses on the gender aspect of population ageing, retirement incomes and labor force participation. More specifically, Austen's work highlights how “the circumstances of women are distinctive; how their contributions to economic performance are often overlooked; and how there is a need for sound understandings of women's circumstances before efficient and equitable policy on population ageing and other issues can be designed”.

Academic and public roles 
Austen is co-creator and current director of the Women in Social Economic Research (WiSER) center at Curtin University. The WiSER group aims to foster quantitative and qualitative research on issues affecting women as well as to engage in current policy debates and industry linkages.

She plays an active role in policy debates about population ageing, retirement, and gender inequality and has contributed to Australian government inquiries on various economic issues.

Austen is a member of the Australian Bureau of Statistics Gender Statistics Advisory Group, the Federal Government's Gender Panel and the Work, Family and Life Policy Roundtable. She serves on the editorial board of Feminist Economics, the Journal of Economic Issues, and the Economic and Labour Relations Review.

Selected publications

References

External links 
Siobhan Austen at IDEAS Repec
Siobhan Austen at Research Gate

Australian economists
Academic staff of Curtin University
University of Melbourne alumni
Feminist economists
Labor economists
Living people
Year of birth missing (living people)